

Heinz Cramer (24 May 1911 – 5 September 2003) was a German pilot during World War II, and a recipient of the Knight's Cross of the Iron Cross of Nazi Germany. Cramer was shot down by British fighters in September 1940 and was held until 1947.  He later joined the Bundeswehr and retired in 1966 as a Brigadegeneral.

Awards and decorations
 
 Knight's Cross of the Iron Cross on 18 September 1940 as Major and Gruppenkommandeur of the II.(K)/Lehrgeschwader 1

References

Citations

Bibliography

 

1911 births
2003 deaths
Military personnel from Strasbourg
People from Alsace-Lorraine
Luftwaffe pilots
Bundeswehr generals
German World War II pilots
Brigadier generals of the German Air Force
Recipients of the Knight's Cross of the Iron Cross
German prisoners of war in World War II held by the United Kingdom